Good Hope is a census-designated place in Riverside County, California. The 2010 United States census reported Good Hope's population was 9,192.

Geography
According to the United States Census Bureau, the CDP covers an area of 11.2 square miles (29.1 km), all of it land.

Climate
The climate in this area is described by the Köppen Climate Classification System as  "dry-summer subtropical"  often referred to as "Mediterranean" and abbreviated as Csa.
<div style="width:75%;">

Demographics

At the 2010 census Good Hope had a population of 9,192. The racial makeup of Good Hope was 4,156 (45.2%) White, 669 (7.3%) African American, 98 (1.1%) Native American, 64 (0.7%) Asian, 4 (0.0%) Pacific Islander, 3,885 (42.3%) from other races, and 316 (3.4%) from two or more races. Hispanic or Latino of any race were 7,319 persons (79.6%).

The census reported that 9,181 people (99.9% of the population) lived in households, 3 (0%) lived in non-institutionalized group quarters, and 8 (0.1%) were institutionalized.

There were 2,103 households, 1,266 (60.2%) had children under the age of 18 living in them, 1,194 (56.8%) were opposite-sex married couples living together, 357 (17.0%) had a female householder with no husband present, 231 (11.0%) had a male householder with no wife present.  There were 136 (6.5%) unmarried opposite-sex partnerships, and 29 (1.4%) same-sex married couples or partnerships. 231 households (11.0%) were one person and 87 (4.1%) had someone living alone who was 65 or older. The average household size was 4.37.  There were 1,782 families (84.7% of households); the average family size was 4.60.

The age distribution was 3,185 people (34.6%) under the age of 18, 1,134 people (12.3%) aged 18 to 24, 2,362 people (25.7%) aged 25 to 44, 1,816 people (19.8%) aged 45 to 64, and 695 people (7.6%) who were 65 or older.  The median age was 27.2 years. For every 100 females, there were 108.6 males.  For every 100 females age 18 and over, there were 105.4 males.

There were 2,370 housing units at an average density of 211.0 per square mile, of the occupied units 1,257 (59.8%) were owner-occupied and 846 (40.2%) were rented. The homeowner vacancy rate was 2.8%; the rental vacancy rate was 5.8%.  5,425 people (59.0% of the population) lived in owner-occupied housing units and 3,756 people (40.9%) lived in rental housing units.

References

Census-designated places in Riverside County, California
Census-designated places in California